In organic chemistry, a carbamate is a category of organic compounds with the general formula  and structure , which are formally derived from carbamic acid.  The term includes organic compounds (e.g., the ester ethyl carbamate), formally obtained by replacing one or more of the hydrogen atoms by other organic functional groups; as well as salts with the carbamate anion  (e.g. ammonium carbamate).

Polymers whose units are joined by carbamate groups  are an important family of plastics, the polyurethanes.

Properties
While carbamic acids are unstable, many carbamate esters or ionic) are stable and well known.

Equilibrium with carbonate and bicarbonate
In water solutions, the carbamate anion slowly equilibrates with the ammonium  cation and the carbonate  or bicarbonate  anions:
 
 

Calcium carbamate is soluble in water, whereas calcium carbonate is not.  Adding a calcium salt to an ammonium carbamate/carbonate solution will precipitate some calcium carbonate immediately, and then slowly precipitate more as the carbamate hydrolyzes.

Synthesis

Carbamate Salts
The salt ammonium carbamate is generated by treatment of ammonia with carbon dioxide:
2 NH3  +  CO2   →    NH4[H2NCO2]

Carbamate esters
Carbamate esters also arise via alcoholysis of carbamoyl chlorides:
R2NC(O)Cl + R'OH → R2NCO2R' + HCl
Alternatively, carbamates can be formed from chloroformates and amines:
R'OC(O)Cl + R2NH → R2NCO2R' + HCl
Carbamates may be formed from the Curtius rearrangement, where isocyanates formed are reacted with an alcohol.
RCON3 → RNCO + N2
RNCO + R′OH → RNHCO2R′

Natural occurrence
Within nature carbon dioxide can bind with neutral amine groups to form a carbamate, this post-translational modification is known as carbamylation. This modification is known to occur on several important proteins; see examples below.

Hemoglobin
The N-terminal amino groups of valine residues in the α- and β-chains of deoxyhemoglobin exist as carbamates. They help to stabilise the protein when it becomes deoxyhemoglobin, and increases the likelihood of the release of remaining oxygen molecules bound to the protein. This stabilizing effect should not be confused with the Bohr effect (an indirect effect caused by carbon dioxide).

Urease and phosphotriesterase
The ε-amino groups of the lysine residues in urease and phosphotriesterase also feature carbamate. The carbamate derived from aminoimidazole is an intermediate in the biosynthesis of inosine. Carbamoyl phosphate is generated from carboxyphosphate
rather than CO2.

CO2 capture by ribulose 1,5-bisphosphate carboxylase
Perhaps the most prevalent carbamate is the one involved in the capture of CO2 by plants.  This process is necessary for their growth. The enzyme ribulose 1,5-bisphosphate carboxylase/oxygenase (RuBisCO) fixes a molecule of carbon dioxide as phosphoglycerate in the Calvin cycle. At the active site of the enzyme, a Mg2+ ion is bound to glutamate and aspartate residues as well as a lysine carbamate. The carbamate is formed when an uncharged lysine side chain near the ion reacts with a carbon dioxide molecule from the air (not the substrate carbon dioxide molecule), which then renders it charged, and, therefore, able to bind the Mg2+ ion.

Applications

Synthesis of urea
Although not usually isolated as such, the salt ammonium carbamate is produced on a large scale as an intermediate in the production of the commodity chemical urea from ammonia and carbon dioxide.

Polyurethane plastics

Polyurethanes contain multiple carbamate groups as part of their structure. The "urethane" in the name "polyurethane" refers to these carbamate groups; the term "urethane links" describe how carbamates polymerize. In contrast, the substance commonly called "urethane", ethyl carbamate, is neither a component of polyurethanes, nor is it used in their manufacture. Urethanes are usually formed by reaction of an alcohol with an isocyanate. Commonly, urethanes made by a non-isocyanate route are called carbamates.

Polyurethane polymers have a wide range of properties and are commercially available as foams, elastomers, and solids. Typically, polyurethane polymers are made by combining diisocyanates, e.g. toluene diisocyanate, and diols, where the carbamate groups are formed by reaction of the alcohols with the isocyanates:
RN=C=O + R′OH → RNHC(O)OR′

Carbamate insecticides

The so-called carbamate insecticides feature the carbamate ester functional group. Included in this group are aldicarb (Temik), carbofuran (Furadan), carbaryl (Sevin), ethienocarb, fenobucarb, oxamyl, and methomyl. These insecticides kill insects by reversibly inactivating the enzyme acetylcholinesterase (IRAC mode of action 1a). The organophosphate pesticides also inhibit this enzyme, although irreversibly, and cause a more severe form of cholinergic poisoning (the similar IRAC MoA 1b).

Fenoxycarb has a carbamate group but acts as a juvenile hormone mimic, rather than inactivating acetylcholinesterase.

The insect repellent icaridin is a substituted carbamate.

Carbamate nerve agents
While the carbamate acetylcholinesterase inhibitors are commonly referred to as "carbamate insecticides" due to their generally high selectivity for insect acetylcholinesterase enzymes over the mammalian versions, the most potent compounds such as aldicarb and carbofuran are still capable of inhibiting mammalian acetylcholinesterase enzymes at low enough concentrations that they pose a significant risk of poisoning to humans, especially when used in large amounts for agricultural applications. Other carbamate based acetylcholinesterase inhibitors are known with even higher toxicity to humans, and some such as T-1123 and EA-3990 were investigated for potential military use as nerve agents. However, since all compounds of this type have a quaternary ammonium group with a permanent positive charge, they have poor blood–brain barrier penetration, and also are only stable as crystalline salts or aqueous solutions, and so were not considered to have suitable properties for weaponisation.

Preservatives and cosmetics
Iodopropynyl butylcarbamate is a wood and paint preservative and used in cosmetics.

Chemical research
Some of the most common amine protecting groups, such as BOC, FMOC, Cbz and troc are carbamates.

Medicine

Ethyl carbamate
Urethane (ethyl carbamate) was once produced commercially in the United States as a chemotherapy agent and for other medicinal purposes. It was found to be toxic and largely ineffective. It is occasionally used as a veterinary medicine.

Carbamate drugs
In addition, some carbamates are used in human pharmacotherapy, for example, the acetylcholinesterase inhibitors neostigmine and rivastigmine, whose chemical structure is based on the natural alkaloid physostigmine. Other examples are meprobamate and its derivatives like carisoprodol, felbamate, mebutamate, phenprobamate, and tybamate, a class of anxiolytic and muscle relaxant drugs widely used in the 1960s before the rise of benzodiazepines, and still used nowadays in some cases. Carbachol is primarily used for various ophthalmic purposes.

The protease inhibitor darunavir for HIV treatment also contains a carbamate functional group.

Ephedroxane also fits the mould that it is from this group.

Toxicity
Besides inhibiting human acetylcholinesterase (although to a lesser degree than the insect enzyme), carbamate insecticides also target human melatonin receptors. The human health effects of carbamates are well documented in the list of known endocrine disruptor compounds. Clinical effects of carbamate exposure can vary from slightly toxic to highly toxic depending on a variety of factors including such as dose and route of exposure with ingestion and inhalation resulting in the most rapid clinical effects. These clinical manifestations of carbamate intoxication are muscarinic signs, nicotinic signs, and in rare cases central nervous system signs.

Sulfur analogues
There are two oxygen atoms in a carbamate (1), ROC(=O)NR2, and either or both of them can be conceptually replaced by sulfur. Analogues of carbamates with only one of the oxygens replaced by sulfur are called thiocarbamates (2 and 3). Carbamates with both oxygens replaced by sulfur are called dithiocarbamates (4), RSC(=S)NR2.

There are two different structurally isomeric types of thiocarbamate:
O-thiocarbamates (2), ROC(=S)NR2, where the carbonyl group (C=O) is replaced with a thiocarbonyl group (C=S)
S-thiocarbamates (3), RSC(=O)NR2, where the R–O– group is replaced with an R–S– group

O-thiocarbamates can isomerise to S-thiocarbamates, for example in the Newman–Kwart rearrangement.

See also
Methyl carbamate
Ethyl carbamate
Polyurethane
Cholinesterase inhibitor

References

Functional groups